"Mary Don't You Weep" (alternately titled "O Mary Don't You Weep", "Oh Mary, Don't You Weep, Don't You Mourn", or variations thereof) is a Spiritual that originates from before the American Civil War – thus it is what scholars call a "slave song," "a label that describes their origins among the enslaved," and it contains "coded messages of hope and resistance."  It is one of the most important of Negro spirituals. It is listed as number 11823 in the Roud Folk Song Index.

The song tells the Biblical story of Mary of Bethany and her distraught pleas to Jesus to raise her brother Lazarus from the dead. Other narratives relate to The Exodus and the Passage of the Red Sea, with the chorus proclaiming Pharaoh's army got drown-ded!, and to God's rainbow covenant to Noah after the Great Flood. With liberation thus one of its themes, the song again became popular during the Civil Rights Movement.  Additionally, a song that explicitly chronicles the victories of the Civil Rights Movement, "If You Miss Me from the Back of the Bus", written by Charles Neblett of The Freedom Singers, was sung to this tune and became one of the most well-known songs of that movement.

In 2015 The Swan Silvertones's version of the song was inducted into the Library of Congress's National Recording Registry for the song's "cultural, artistic and/or historical significance to American society and the nation’s audio legacy".

Recordings

The first recording of the song was by the Fisk Jubilee Singers in 1915. The folklorist Alan Lomax recorded several traditional variants of the song in the 1930s, 40s and 50s across the United States, from Mississippi to Ohio to Michigan, including one version by Huddie Ledbetter (Lead Belly) of Louisiana in 1935.

The best known recordings were made by the vocal gospel group The Caravans in 1958, with Inez Andrews as the lead singer, and The Swan Silvertones in 1959. "Mary Don't You Weep" became The Swan Silvertones' greatest hit, and lead singer Claude Jeter's interpolation "I'll be your bridge over deep water if you trust in my name"  served as Paul Simon's inspiration to write his 1970 song "Bridge over Troubled Water".  The spiritual's lyric God gave Noah the rainbow sign, no more water the fire next time inspired the title for The Fire Next Time, James Baldwin's 1963 account of race relations in America.

Many other recordings have been made, by artists ranging from The Soul Stirrers to Burl Ives. Bing Crosby included the song in a medley on his album 101 Gang Songs (1961).
Pete Seeger gave it additional folk music visibility by performing it at the 1964 Newport Folk Festival, and played it many times throughout his career, adapting the lyrics and stating the song's relevance as an American song, not just a spiritual. In 1960, Stonewall Jackson recorded a country version of the song, where Mary is a young woman left by her lover on the wedding day to fight in the Civil War, and he died in the burning of Atlanta; the song became a hit when it peaked at #12 in Country charts and #41 in Pop charts. In the 1960s, Jamaican artist Justin Hinds had a ska hit with "Jump Out Of The Frying Pan", whose lyrics borrowed heavily from the spiritual. Paul Clayton's version "Pharaoh's Army" appears in Home-Made Songs & Ballads, which was released in 1961. James Brown rewrote the lyrics of the original spiritual for his 1964 soul hit with his vocal group The Famous Flames,  "Oh Baby Don't You Weep". Aretha Franklin recorded a live version of the song for her 1972 album Amazing Grace. An a cappella version by Take 6, simply called "Mary", received wide airplay after appearing on the group's eponymous debut album in 1988. The song is sung briefly at the beginning of the music video for Bone Thugs N Harmony's 1996 "Tha Crossroads". In a pounding big group folk arrangement, it was one of the highlights of the 2006 Bruce Springsteen with The Seeger Sessions Band Tour. The song also appeared on Mike Farris' 2007 album Salvation in Lights.  This song appears in The Peter Yarrow Songbook and on the accompanying recorded album, Favorite Folks Songs.  Entitled as "Don't You Weep, Mary", this song is on The Kingston Trio album Close-Up.

Jazz guitarist Eric Gale made a recording of this song in his 1977 album Multiplication, as the opening track.

A 1988 recording of this song by Sister Thea Bowman, FSPA, first issued on stereocassette by Pauline Music (Boston), was re-released in digital format in 2020 in the digital album, Songs of My People: The Complete Collection for the 30th anniversary of Sister Bowman's death. (Bowman, who was suffering from advanced cancer during the recording of the song, has been officially proposed as a candidate for canonization by the Catholic Church.)

There was also an adaptation of this song recorded in the Greek language. The title was "Mairi Mi Lypasai Pia", and was written and recorded by the Greek songwriter, Manos Xydous, on his 2010 album Otan tha fygo ena vrady apo 'do as well as on the collection Epityhies 2011.

In Denmark, the song was recorded in the sixties by the popular vocal group Four Jacks entitled "O Marie, Jeg Vil Hjem Til Dig". The subject, inspired by Stonewall Jackson's version, was changed and turned into a comic story about private in the Danish army who hated being a soldier and therefore was longing to return home to his sweet-heart, Marie. The single was very successful receiving a lot of airplay during the sixties, seventies and eighties.

In 2018, a recording of the song done by Prince in 1983 was released as the first track from Piano and a Microphone 1983 and was used in the Spike Lee movie BlacKkKlansman.

References

External links
Lyrics at Gospelsonglyrics.org
Matt Orel's recordings history

Gospel songs
American folk songs
United States National Recording Registry recordings
1915 songs
Prince (musician) songs
Songs about Jesus